Events in the year 2016 in Suriname.

Incumbents
 President: Dési Bouterse
 Vice President: Ashwin Adhin
 Speaker: Jennifer Simons

Events

Sport
5-21 August – Suriname at the 2016 Summer Olympics: 6 competitors in 4 sports

Deaths

19 January – Max Nijman, singer (b. 1941).

13 November – Aloysius Ferdinandus Zichem, Roman Catholic bishop (b. 1933).

References

 
2010s in Suriname
Years of the 21st century in Suriname
Suriname
Suriname